Mitan-myeon is a myeon (township) in Pyeongchang county of Gangwon-do South Korea. The myeon is located in northern central part of the county. The total area of Mitan-myeon is 109.74 square kilometers, and, as of 2008, the population was 1,881 people.

Natural monument 
 The Dragon cave

References 

Pyeongchang County
Towns and townships in Gangwon Province, South Korea